A Sinhalese name or Sinhala name may contain two or three parts: a patronymic, one or more given names, and sometimes a surname, which was often absent in the past. Full names can be rather long, and hence are often shortened, by omitting or abbreviating the family name and one of the given names, as in R. M. S. Ariyaratna.

Family names can be distinguished by the suffix -ge or -ghe, though this suffix may accidentally result from a particular transliteration of a Sinhalese word, such as simhe or simghe (lion).

Given names can be masculine, feminine and gender neutral.

Sinhalese surnames often originate from Sanskrit. However, as a consequence of the Portuguese invasion of Sri Lanka, during the 16th and 17th centuries, many Portuguese language surnames were adopted among the Sinhalese people. As a result, Perera and Fernando eventually became the most common names in Sri Lanka.

History

Structure 
Sinhalese names usually consists of three parts. The first part is the patronymic name (family name) of the father, ancestor name or 'house name', which often has the suffix ‘-ge’ at the end of it, this is known as the 'Ge' name (ge meaning house in Sinhalese). The second part is the personal name (given name) and the third part is the surname.

For example, in the name Rajapaksha Mudiyanselage Siril Ariyaratna, Rajapaksha is the first part of the family name, Mudiyanselage is the 'Ge' name (second part of the family name) and Siril and Ariyaratna are two given names.

Some names contain a family name, a given name, and a surname (Type 1) while some names contain only a family name and a given name (Type 2). Modern Sinhalese names do not contain a family name and only contain a given name and a surname (Type 3).

 In Sri Lankan passport, the name is divided into two parts as Surname and Other names wheres Surname means the Last name and Other names means the First name + Middle name. When a person's name contain all three parts (Type 1) or does not contain a Surname (Type 2), he/she can alternatively choose to use Family name as the Surname in passport.

Ge name

Family name

Foreign origin names
The Portuguese and Dutch being in Sri Lanka has left a legacy where many Sinhalese people converted religion or took on foreign names through intermarriage or adoption.

Portuguese

 Almeida/de Almeida 
 Cabral/Cabraal 
 Correa/Corea 
 Costa/de Costa 
 De Alwis, derived from the surname ‘Alves’
 Dias 
 Fernando 
 Fonseka 
 Gomes
 Mendis, derived from the surname ‘Mendes’
 Nonis, derived from the surname ‘Nunes’
 Peiris, derived from the surname ‘Peres’
 Perera/Pereira 
 Pigera from the surname 'Figueira'
 Sigera, derived from the surname ‘Siqueira’
 Silva/de Silva
 Suwaris from the surname 'Soares'
 Thabrew/de Abrew, derived from the surname ‘Abreu’
 Tissera, derived from the surname ‘Teixeira’

Given name

References

Citations

Bibliography

 
  Ebook: .

External links
 Behind the name – Sinhalese Names

 
Names by culture